Gabriele Reismüller (30 November 1920 – 24 November 1969) was a German actress. She appeared in twenty-seven films between 1941 and 1969.

Selected filmography
 Venus on Trial (1941)
 The Millionaire (1947)
 Insolent and in Love (1948)
 Regimental Music (1950)
  Marriage Strike (1953)
 Gustav Adolf's Page (1960)

References

External links

1920 births
1969 deaths
German film actresses